The following is a list of recurring Saturday Night Live characters and sketches introduced during the thirty-eighth season of SNL, which began on September 15, 2012.

Puppet Class
Anthony Peter Coleman (Bill Hader), a war veteran, attends a puppeteering class with his identical puppet Tony. His nightmarish memories of combat put a damper on the light puppetry class.

The Girl You Wish You Hadn't Started a Conversation with at a Party
Cecily Strong appears on Weekend Update and provides incoherent diatribes, largely political in nature, with plenty of malaprops, while texting and rummaging in her purse.

Following the character's first appearance, TV Guide called the character "hilarious"; Entertainment Weekly labeled it "the funniest performance of the night." The sketch was the fifth most popular SNL clip on Hulu in 2012.

In an interview with Chicago Magazine, which said the character "has become a sensation", Strong said:[The character is] a mix of a lot of people—including myself, unfortunately. But it came about when I was talking to one of the writers, Colin Jost. And I said something that sounded like a drunk-girl ramble. And we just started riffing on that. And as it turns out, I’m not the only one who’s had a conversation with this type of girl.

Strong told the State Journal-Register that the character was a favorite of hers. SNL alum Jimmy Fallon praised the character during an interview with Strong on Late Night With Jimmy Fallon.

Regine
Regine (Fred Armisen) is a rude, pretentious woman introduced in each appearance as the host's new girlfriend. The host demonstrates to his friends how Regine goes into physical contortions of ecstasy when he touches certain parts of her body.

Kirby
Bobby Moynihan plays astronaut Kirby J. Buttercream, who annoys his fellow astronauts with stories about his love for his "little kitty cat", Fuzz Aldrin.  At the end of each sketch, it is revealed that he smuggled his cat on board the spacecraft.

Last Call (Sheila Sovage)
Sheila Sovage (Kate McKinnon) and a character played by the host are the final two customers at a bar, and convince themselves to hook up despite their lack of physical chemistry. Their awkward attempts at hitting on and kissing each other dismay the bartender (Kenan Thompson).

Girlfriends Talk Show
Aidy Bryant and Cecily Strong play Morgan and Kyra, the teenage hosts of "Girlfriends Talk Show." Morgan is surprised to find that Kyra has invited her new and impressively cool friend (played by the episode's host) to join them. Throughout the sketch, the new friend rudely dismisses Morgan's contributions, making Morgan increasingly insecure and upset.

"Girlfriends Talk Show" received mixed reviews from reviewers, with several crediting Bryant's performance for making it worthwhile. In discussing the sketch's first appearance, both Vulture and Hitfix singled out Bryant's line, "No, you should be called Roach Wearhouse!" for special appreciation. Rolling Stone called the sketch "side-splitting." However the Huffington Post called the skit "bad" saying it was based entirely on "annoying teenage voice."

Niff and Dana
When two employees (Bobby Moynihan and Cecily Strong) find out at a staff meeting that someone is about to be fired, they assume it's them and use it as an opportunity to call out all their co-workers on various failings and transgressions. The host plays their manager who finally tells Niff and Dana that the fired employee is someone else.

The Ellen Show
Kate McKinnon portrays Ellen DeGeneres, while Vanessa Bayer and Nasim Pedrad play Sophia Grace and Rosie respectively.

Maine Justice
A court show run by Judge Marshall T. Boudreaux (Jason Sudeikis) and Jessop the Bailiff (played by the host) in which a bewildered defendant finds himself surrounded by people who repeatedly emphasize that they are in Bangor, Maine while giving every possible indication that they are in Louisiana. The characters all have thick Southern accents, and make many references to alligators (an alligator is also featured in the show's logo and as a live-hand puppet in the second sketch) and the bayou. In the sketch's first instance, Judge Boudreaux refers to a character going to school "up there" in Connecticut, but says she could also "learn a thing down here in Maine, as well!" Judge Boudreaux and Jessop the Bailiff extoll Maine as the home of jazz and Mardi Gras.

In both episodes, the defendant, who is not a local, inevitably loses the case and is sentenced to eat spicy or soggy New Orleans food.

In the first sketch, when the confused defendant asks about the absurdity of the situation, Judge Boudreaux, Jessop the Bailiff, and the plaintiff offer possibilities like:

 They relocated to Maine after Hurricane Katrina and didn't want to change their ways.
 They're "part of some kind of courtroom exchange program."
 A "space-time portal" exists between Maine and New Orleans and they're confused about which side they're on.

They don't suggest which, if any, of these explanations is the truth.

Former Porn Star Commercials
Three former porn stars—Brecky (Vanessa Bayer), an unnamed woman (Cecily Strong), and a guest (played by the host)—film a barely coherent commercial for a glamorous product, in the hope of receiving free samples from the company.

Eddie
When a guest to his family's home makes a verbal slip-up, obnoxious son Eddie (Taran Killam) proceeds to mock the guest mercilessly.

Olya Povlatsky
Russian native Olya Povlatsky (Kate McKinnon) appears on Weekend Update to describe the hellish conditions of life in her impoverished village.

Sheila Kelly
Sheila Kelly (Melissa McCarthy) is an extremely rude, aggressive, and violent woman.

90's Dating Tips
Donna Fingerneck (Cecily Strong) and Jodi Cork (Kate McKinnon) host a series of instructional videos on dating etiquette in the 1990s.

References

Lists of recurring Saturday Night Live characters and sketches
Saturday Night Live in the 2010s
Saturday Night Live
Saturday Night Live